Hon. Maurice Raymond Gifford CMG (5 May 1859 – 1 July 1910) was a British military officer.

Biography

Born at Ampney Park, Gloucester, he was the son of Robert Francis Gifford, 2nd Baron Gifford, and the brother of Edric Gifford, 3rd Baron Gifford.  On the completion of his education he entered the Merchant Service, and was on board the training ship Worcester for three years.  In 1878, he entered the service of the British Steam Navigation Company, in which he remained until 1882, visiting many parts of the globe. That same year he fought in the Mahdist War and served as assistant correspondent to the Daily Telegraph at the time of the engagement of Tel-el-Kebir. He then went to Canada for 11 years and fought in the North-West Rebellion as one of French's Scouts under Lord Minto, earning the North West Canada Medal and clasp. Next, Gifford went to South Africa and became General Manager of the Bechuanaland Exploration Company and soon became involved in the First Matabele War, 1893. In the Second Matabele War, 1896, he was part of the Bulawayo Field Force during the Siege of Bulawayo, raised Gifford's Horse, and lost his right arm to a Nbatabele bullet.  In the Second Boer War he was attached to the Imperial Yeomanry and was part of the Rhodesian Horse. He participated in the Relief of Mafeking.

He married Marguerite Thorold, the daughter of Capt Thorold of Boothby, on 21 September 1897. Among the presents Gifford gave to his wife at the wedding, was the bullet that cost him his arm. He set it in Matabele gold and arranged it so that the yellow metal formed a double-headed serpent.

On 1 July 1910, while undergoing a rest cure for nervous breakdown, Col. Gifford met his death from a fire caused by his clothes being set alight by a cigarette. He had been cleaning his clothing with petrol just before the incident.

References

1859 births
1910 deaths
People from Gloucester
British colonial army officers
Companions of the Order of St Michael and St George
South African military personnel
British South Africa Police officers
People of the Red River Rebellion
People of the Second Matabele War
British military personnel of the Second Boer War
Younger sons of barons